Khairul Ridzwan Othman (born 7 October 1991 in Seremban, Negeri Sembilan) is a Malaysian footballer formerly playing for Negeri Sembilan FA in Malaysia Super League.

External links
 

Living people
1991 births
Malaysian footballers
People from Negeri Sembilan
Negeri Sembilan FA players
Association football forwards